The 2017 Patriot League baseball tournament took place on consecutive weekends, with the semifinals held May 13–14 and the finals May 19–21. The higher seeded teams hosted each best of three series.  won their first tournament championship and earned the conference's automatic bid to the 2017 NCAA Division I baseball tournament.

Seeding
The top four finishers from the regular season are seeded one through four, with the top seed hosting the fourth seed and second seed hosting the third. The visiting team will be designated as the home team in the second game of each series.

Results

All-Tournament team
The following players were named to the All-Tournament Team.

Most Outstanding Player
Brendan King was named Tournament Most Outstanding Player.  King was a senior pitcher for Holy Cross who won two games in the tournament with 14.1 IP and a 1.88 ERA.

References

Tournament
Patriot League Baseball Tournament
Pat